Mass Appeal Records is an American independent record label founded in 2014. The label is the music division of the Mass Appeal Media Group. In May 2014, it was announced that American rapper Nas was launching an indie label with Mass Appeal with Peter Bittenbender of company Decon. The label's current roster includes artists such as: Nas, DJ Shadow, Mannie Fresh, Dave East, Fashawn, Black Milk, and Keyon Harrold.

Since its inception, the label has put out releases including the singles "Old English” from Young Thug, Freddie Gibbs, and ASAP Ferg and Jay Electronica's "Exhibit C"; albums such as Fashawn's The Ecology, Pimp C's Long Live the Pimp, and J Dilla's The Diary, and mixtapes, such as Dave East's Hate Me Now.

History
On October 24, 2014, the label released Run the Jewels album Run the Jewels 2. The album was crowned as number-one album of the year by Pitchfork, Stereogum and Spin and number-two hip hop album of the year by Rolling Stone. In 2015, Marvel Comics released comic book covers inspired by Run the Jewels.

Following his signing to Mass Appeal, Fashawn released his long-awaited second album The Ecology on February 24, 2015. The album features guest appearances by Nas, Aloe Blacc, Dom Kennedy, and more.

Mass Appeal Records released The Mountain Will Fall, the fifth studio album by DJ Shadow on June 24, 2016. It was his first studio album since 2011's The Less You Know, the Better. The album was ranked at number one on Top Dance/Electronic Albums at Billboard.

On December 4, 2015, the label released Pimp C's fifth album, the posthumous Long Live the Pimp. The following year, on April 15, 2016, the label released J Dilla's vocal album The Diary. The album was ranked at number two on Pitchforks list of "Most Promising" releases of Record Store Day 2016. NPR included "Fuck the Police" in their Songs We Love segment. Mass Appeal released Rubble Kings: The Album on January 15, 2016.

J Dilla released The Diary through Mass Appeal on April 15, 2016. DJ Shadow released The Mountain Will Fall on June 24, 2016. Mass Appeal released The Land (Music from the Motion Picture) on July 29, 2016. Dave East released Kairi Chanel on September 30, 2016. Boldy James released The Art of Rock Climbing on January 27, 2017, and House of Blues on February 24, 2017. Fashawn released Manna on August 11, 2017. Dave East released Paranoia: A True Story on August 18, 2017. Ezri released be right back on October 5, 2017. Dave East released Paranoia 2 on January 16, 2018. Black Milk released Fever on February 23, 2018. In May 2017, Mass Appeal announced a joint venture publishing company with Pulse Music Group. In June 2018, a new partnership with Universal Music Group was announced with the companies entering into a multi-year global agreement.

On June 15, 2018, Nas released his twelfth studio album Nasir, through Mass Appeal Records and Def Jam Recordings. It succeeds Nas' album Life Is Good, released six years prior in 2012. The album was a part of the GOOD Music 7-song, 5-album rollout executive produced by Kanye West, featuring appearances from Kanye West, Puff Daddy, 070 Shake, Tony Williams, and The-Dream. Nasir debuted at number five on the US Billboard 200 with 77,000 album-equivalent units, of which 49,000 were pure album sales. It serves as Nas's twelfth top-ten album in the United States.

In August 2018, Cantrell released his debut EP Stardust 2 Angels.  The project was accompanied by a Mass Appeal-produced documentary available via YouTube, entitled, "Stardust 2: Cantrell on Skating, New Album and Albany, GA | Mass Appeal".

Mass Appeal artist Stro released his debut project, Nice 2 Meet You, Again on October 19, 2018. The EP has one feature by Mannywellz. Cuz Lightyear released Blue Slime on November 30, 2018, featuring rappers Lil Baby, Killer Mike, and Yung Bans. Mass Appeal's resident punk band, The 1865, released Don't Tread On We! on January 25, 2019. The 1865 has four members: Mass Appeal's own director, Sacha Jenkins, alongside Carolyn "Honeychild" Coleman, Flora Lucini, Chuck Treece, and Jason "Biz" Lucas. The label then released a compilation album called the Starting 5: Vol. 1 on February 5, 2019, with features from Nas, Black Milk, and Liana Bank$. The project had an accompanying tour during rollout, The Starting 5 Tour, with artists Ezri, Stro, Fashawn, Cantrell, and 070 Phi.

Artists

Current
Nas
DIVINE
Fashawn
Dave East
De La Soul
Mannie Fresh
DJ Shadow
Black Milk
N.O.R.E.
Stro
Statik Selektah
Cuz Lightyear 
 070 Phi
 atm

Former
 Pimp C (deceased before label's foundation, released his most recent posthumous album Long Live the Pimp)
 Bishop Nehru (currently self-releasing through Nehruvia LLC)
 Run the Jewels (currently signed to BMG)
 Kiing Shooter (deceased)
 Cantrell
 Kidshot
 Ikka (currently signed to Kalamkaar)
 Raja Kumari (currently self-releasing through Godmother Records)
Boldy James (Currently signed to Griselda Records)

Discography

See also
Mass Appeal Magazine
Ill Will Records
Decon Records

References

External links
 Official website-Run the Jewels
 Official website- DJ Shadow

 

American record labels
Nas
American hip hop record labels
Record labels established in 2014
Vanity record labels
Hardcore hip hop record labels
2014 establishments in New York (state)